Mira Gut is a small community in the Canadian province of Nova Scotia, located in the Cape Breton Regional Municipality on Cape Breton Island where the Mira River enters into Mira Bay. It features both fresh and saltwater beaches and is a popular swimming area during the summer months.

References
  Mira Gut on Destination Nova Scotia

Communities in the Cape Breton Regional Municipality
General Service Areas in Nova Scotia